Jörg Fiedler (also spelled Joerg; born 21 February 1978) is a German épée fencer, European champion in 2011 and 2013, and three-time team silver world medallist (1999, 2003, and 2005).

Fiedler took part in the 2000 Summer Olympics, where he lost in the second round to Oleksandr Horbachuk. In the team event, Germany finished 5th. He won a bronze medal with Sven Schmid and Daniel Strigel in the team épée event at the 2004 Summer Olympics. In the 2012 Summer Olympics, he was defeated by South Korean Jung Jin-sun in the quarter-finals.

In addition to his career as an athlete, Fiedler is also a fencing coach.

References

External links

 
  (archive)
 
 
 
 

1978 births
Living people
German male fencers
Olympic fencers of Germany
Fencers at the 2000 Summer Olympics
Fencers at the 2004 Summer Olympics
Fencers at the 2012 Summer Olympics
Olympic bronze medalists for Germany
Olympic medalists in fencing
Sportspeople from Leipzig
German épée fencers
Medalists at the 2004 Summer Olympics
Left-handed fencers